Oscar Peterson at the Concertgebouw is a 1958 live album by the Oscar Peterson Trio.
Although said to be recorded in Europe, the music comes from a Chicago concert at the Civic Opera House. Five additional selections are from an appearance in Los Angeles.

Track listing
"The Lady Is a Tramp" (Lorenz Hart, Richard Rodgers) – 4:51
"We'll Be Together Again" (Carl T. Fischer, Frankie Laine) – 2:34
"Bluesology" (Milt Jackson) – 9:23
"Budo" (aka "Hallucinations") (Miles Davis, Bud Powell) – 4:42
"I've Got the World on a String" (Harold Arlen, Ted Koehler) – 6:41
"Daahoud" (Clifford Brown) – 7:00
"When Lights Are Low" (Benny Carter, Spencer Williams) – 4:03
"Evrev" (Oscar Peterson) – 4:51
"Should I?" (Nacio Herb Brown, Arthur Freed) – 5:16
"Big Fat Mama" (Lucky Millinder, Stafford Simon) – 7:34
"(Back Home In) Indiana" (James F. Hanley, Ballard MacDonald) – 4:07
"Joy Spring" (Brown) – 5:33
"Elevation" (Elliot Lawrence, Gerry Mulligan) – 3:28

Personnel
Oscar Peterson – piano
Ray Brown – double bass
Herb Ellis – jazz guitar

References

Oscar Peterson live albums
Albums produced by Norman Granz
1958 live albums
Verve Records live albums